Hsinchu (Chinese: 新竹, Pinyin: Xīnzhú, Wade–Giles: Hsin¹-chu²) is a city located in northwestern Taiwan. It is the most populous city in nominal Taiwan Province, not among the special municipalities, with estimated 450,655 inhabitants. Hsinchu is a coastal city bordering the Taiwan Strait to the west, Hsinchu County to the north and east, and Miaoli County to the south. Nicknamed the Windy City for its strong northeastern monsoon during the autumn and winter seasons.

The area was originally settled by the Austronesian Taiwanese indigenous peoples, with the settlement being named "Tek-kham" by the Hoklo immigrants. The city was founded by Han Chinese settlers in 1711, and renamed to its current form in 1878. During the Japanese Era, the city was the seat of Shinchiku Prefecture, named after the city. The prefecture encompassed present-day Hsinchu City and County, as well as entire Taoyuan and Miaoli. After the ROC rule in 1945, the urban area of Hsinchu was organized as a provincial city.

In 1980, the Taiwanese government established the Hsinchu Science Park, a major industrial park, a significant centre for semiconductor manufacturing, industrial and computer technology development. The park contributes a major proportion of Taiwan's GDP. This made Hsinchu a vital economic hub for its economy; the headquarters of TSMC, world's largest independent semiconductor foundry, and United Microelectronics Corporation, are both located in the park.

Besides its industry, Hsinchu is also an important cultural center of Taiwan with an abundance of heritage sites. The Chenghuang Temple of Hsinchu, built in 1747, is a common prayer destination. The research institutions of National Yang Ming Chiao Tung University and National Tsing Hua University are both located near the science park.

Etymology
Hsin-chu is the Wade-Giles romanization of the Mandarin pronunciation of the Chinese name . The same name is rendered Xīnzhú in Hanyu Pinyin and Sinjhú in Tongyong Pinyin.

This name refers to the settlement's original Hokkien name Tek-chhàm, meaning "bamboo barrier". The name may transcribe an aboriginal name meaning "Seashore". The same name is variously recorded as Teukcham, Teuxham, Tekcham, and Teckcham; its Mandarin pronunciation appears as Chuchien.

Hsinchu is popularly nicknamed "The Windy City" for its windy climate and "The Garden City of Culture and Technology" by its tourism department.

History

Early settlement
The area around Hsinchu City was inhabited by the Taokas aboriginies when the Spanish occupied northern Taiwan in the 17th century. Catholic missionaries reached the settlement of Tek-kham in 1626. The Spanish were expelled by the Dutch a few decades later.

Qing Dynasty
Wang and his party of over 180 people were natives of Kinmen who first camped alongside what is now Dongqian Street in East District, Hsinchu.

As part of the reorganization of Taiwan by Shen Baozhen, the viceroy of Liangjiang, Zhuqian Subprefecture (i.e., Tek-kham) was raised to the level of a county and renamed Xinzhu (i.e., Sin-tek or Hsinchu) in 1878. When Taiwan was made a province in 1887, Hsinchu was made a part of Taipeh Prefecture.

Japanese rule

During the Japanese occupation following the First Sino-Japanese War, the cityknown at the time as Shinchikuwas among the province's most populous. In 1904, its 16,371 residents ranked it in 7th place, behind Keelung and ahead of Changhua ("Shoka"). Shinchiku was raised to town status in 1920 and city status in 1930. At the same time, it became the seat of Shinchiku Prefecture. In 1941, its prefecture was expanded, annexing Xiangshan ("Kōzan"). Jiugang ("Kyūminato") and Liujia ("Rokka") merged to become Zhubei ("Chikuhoku").

Republic of China
The Nationalist government of the Republic of China established the Hsinchu City Government in 1945 to oversee all of what had been Shinchiku Prefecture under the Japanese.

In 1946, the Take-Over Committee dissolved and replaced by the Hsinchu County Government, located in Taoyuan. As the administrative districts were readjusted, Hsinchu was granted provincial city status. It used the old prefecture office as its city hall at 120  Road. In February 1946, representative congresses were formed for seven district offices. On 15 April, the city congress was formed. Provincial representatives were elected from among the city legislators.

On 16 August 1950, the administrative districts on Taiwan were re-adjusted once more, demarcating 16 counties and 5 provincial cities.

In June 1982, under presidential order, the Xiangshan Township of Hsinchu County merged into Hsinchu City. A new municipal government was formally established on 1 July 1982, comprising 103 villages and 1,635 neighborhoods. These were organized into the East, North, and Xiangshan districts by 1November. By June 1983, the new government consisted of three bureaus (Civil Service, Public Works, and Education), four departments (Finance, Social Welfare, Compulsory Military Service, and Land Affairs), four offices (Secretary, Planning, Personnel, and Auditing), and 49 various sections. The Police Department, Tax Department, and Medicine and Hygiene Department were considered affiliate institutions.

From 1994 to 1999, as Taiwan made its transition from authoritarian rule to a representative democracy and the mostly pro forma provincial level of government began to be dissolved, regulations were established for the self-government of Hsinchu. A deputy mayor, consumer officer, and three consultants were added to the city government. In 2002, the city added a Bureau of Labor and transferred Compulsory Military Service to the Department of Civil Service.

A movement is underway from 2021 to have Hsinchu City and Hsinchu County to be upgraded to the nation's seventh special municipality.

Geography
The city is bordered by Hsinchu County to the north and east, Miaoli County to the south, and the Taiwan Strait to the west.

Climate
Hsinchu's climate is humid subtropical (Koppen: Cfa). The city is located in a part of the island that has a rainy season that lasts from February to September, with the heaviest time coming late April through August during the southwest monsoon, and also experiences heavy "plum rains" in May and early June. The city succumbs to hot humid weather from June until September, while October to December are arguably the most pleasant times of year. Hsinchu is affected by easterly winds off of the East China Sea. Natural hazards such as typhoons and earthquakes are common in the region.

Government

Hsinchu City is administered as a city. North District is the seat of Hsinchu City which houses the Hsinchu City Government and Hsinchu City Council. The incumbent Mayor of Hsinchu City is Ann Kao Hung-an of the Taiwan People's Party.

Administrative divisions
Hsinchu has 3 districts:

Colors indicate the common language status of Hakka within each division.

Politics
Hsinchu City voted one Kuomintang legislator to be in the Legislative Yuan during the 2020 Taiwan general election.

The city was historically pan-Blue, but in recent years the pan-Green coalition has started to rise in popularity. In addition, the economic development and urbanization in the city has caused an influx of a highly-educated population. As a result, local factions have decreased in power, and political parties have a greater importance in local elections.

Economy
The Hsinchu Science Park is home to 360 high tech companies. As a result, the city has the highest income level in Taiwan.

The purpose of the park is to attract high tech investment to Taiwan and to make the area the economic center for the information industry. The park is designed to cater for high quality R&D, production, work, life and also recreation. From its establishment in 1978, the government has invested over NT$30 billion on software and hardware ventures. Viewing the performance of Hsinchu Science Park in the past 21 years, it can be said that it holds a decisive position in the economic development in Taiwan, with international acclaim.

Although the semiconductor and related electronic businesses have been doing well, they face fierce competition from South Korea and the United States. This has resulted in lower profits and over-supply of some electronic products such as memory and semiconductors. Therefore, manufacturers, government, academia, and the R&D sectors all recognize the challenges faced by Taiwan's high-tech development. The government has endeavored to upgrade Hsinchu Science Park into a global manufacturing and R&D center of high-end products. They also plan to intensify the cooperation among the manufacturing, academic, and research sectors by introducing incubation centers, in order to elevate the technological standard in the park. Further, through the development of the northern, central, and southern industrial park and its satellite sites, it hopes to sow the seeds of high tech business in all of Taiwan, leading to a vigorous era of high tech development.

In 2020, Hsinchu is classified as a "Sufficiency" level global city by the Globalization and World Cities Research Network.

Education

Hsinchu City is one of the most focused educational centers in northern Taiwan. It has six universities in this concentrated area and among these universities, National Yang Ming Chiao Tung University and National Tsing Hua University are highly focused by government in Taiwan on its academic development.  Other public and private educational institutions in the city included 33 elementary schools, 19 middle schools, 12 high school and complete secondary school.

International schools (grade school and secondary school)
 Pacific American School
 Hsinchu International School
 Hsinchu American School

High Schools
 National Experimental High School
 National Hsinchu Senior High School
 National Hsinchu Girls' Senior High School
 National Hsinchu Commercial Vocational High School
 National Hsinchu Senior Industrial Vocational School
 Hsinchu Municipal Chien Kung Senior High School
 Hsinchu Municipal Cheng Te Senior High School
 Hsinchu Municipal Hsiang Shan Senior High School
 Hsinchu Shu Guang Girls' Senior High School
 Hsinchu World Senior High School
 Hsinchu St. Peter High School
 Hsinchu Kuang-Fu Senior High School

Universities
 National Yang Ming Chiao Tung University
 National Tsing Hua University
 Chung Hua University
 Hsuan Chuang University
 Yuanpei University of Medical Technology
 National Hsinchu University of Education

Tourist attractions

 Aqueduct Museum of Hsinchu City
 Black Bat Squadron Memorial Hall
 Chenghuang Temple of Hsinchu
 Glass Museum of Hsinchu City
 Hsinchu City Art Site of Railway Warehouse
 Hsinchu CKS Baseball Stadium
 Hsinchu Museum of Military Dependents Village
 Hsinchu Fish Harbor
 Hsinchu Zoo
 National Hsinchu Living Arts Center
 17 Kilometer Coastal Scenic Area
 Eighteen Peaks Mountain Park
 Hsinchu Eastern Gate
 Chenghuang Temple Night Market
 Tsing Hua Night Market
 Green Grass Lake

Sports
Taiwan's Chinese Professional Baseball League has a professional baseball team, Wei Chuan Dragons, based in Hsinchu.

Major sporting events held by Hsinchu include:
 1997 World Youth Baseball Championship
 2005 BWF Para-Badminton World Championships

Transportation

Rail
Hsinchu City is mainly served by Hsinchu railway station along with five other minor TRA stations on both Western Trunk line and Neiwan line. There is also an HSR station in nearby Zhubei, Hsinchu County on Taiwan High Speed Rail.

Cycling 
Hsinchu City has recently created a series of cycling routes to help cyclists navigate the city more easily. Hsinchu is home to many cycling clubs.

Sea ports 
Pleasure and fishing ports are located at Nanliao Street, North District and in Haishan, Xiangshan district.

Airport 
Military air base in North District.

Notable natives 
 Chi Cheng, the 1968 Olympic bronze medalist in track and field
 Yuan T. Lee, 1986 Nobel Laureate in Chemistry
 Chiang Hsiao-yen, Vice Premier (1997)
 Lin Cho-liang, Taiwanese American violinist
 Hsieh Su-Wei, Taiwanese tennis player and former World No. 1 in doubles
 Hebe Tien, solo artist and member of the S.H.E
 David Wu, member of the U.S. House of Representatives for the state of Oregon from 1999 until 2011.
 Cyndi Wang, singer
 Chen Qiaoen, singer, actress, 7F Member
 Lü Shao-chia, Taiwanese conductor
 Wen Shang-Yi, guitarist and leader of the band Mayday
 Sabrina, Taiwanese Indonesian singer

International relations

Twin towns — sister cities
Hsinchu is twinned with:

See also 
 Administrative divisions of the Republic of China
 List of cities in Taiwan

Notes

Words in native languages

References

External links 

  
 

 
1982 establishments in Taiwan
Provincial cities of Taiwan